trans-2,3-Butylene carbonate is an organic compound with formula , or (H3C)2(C2H2)(CO3).  It is an ester with a carbonate functional group bonded to both free ends of the trans-2,3-butylene group.  It is also a heterocyclic compound with a five-membered ring containing two oxygen atoms, and can be viewed as a derivative of dioxolane, namely ''trans''-4,5-dimethyl-1,3-dioxolan-2-one.

The compound is an aprotic polar solvent and has been proposed as an ingredient of the electrolyte of lithium batteries.

See also
cis-2,3-Butylene carbonate, a stereoisomer
1,2-Butylene carbonate
Propylene carbonate

References

Solvents
Carbonate esters